North Salem is an unincorporated community in Linn County, in the U.S. state of Missouri.

The community is on a county road approximately one mile south of the Linn-Sullivan county line and Missouri Route O. Browning is 8.5 miles west on Route O. West Yellow Creek flows past west of the location.

History
North Salem was originally called Whig Town, and under the latter name was laid out in 1840, and named for the fact a large share of the first settlers were Whigs in politics. The town site was replatted in 1858, and named after Salem, Indiana, the native home of an early settler. A post office called North Salem was established in 1855, and remained in operation until 1953.

References

Unincorporated communities in Linn County, Missouri
Unincorporated communities in Missouri